An unreliable narrator is a narrator whose credibility is compromised. They can be found in fiction and film, and range from children to mature characters. The term was coined in 1961 by Wayne C. Booth in The Rhetoric of Fiction. While unreliable narrators are almost by definition first-person narrators, arguments have been made for the existence of unreliable second- and third-person narrators, especially within the context of film and television, and sometimes also in literature.

Sometimes the narrator's unreliability is made immediately evident. For instance, a story may open with the narrator making a plainly false or delusional claim or admitting to being severely mentally ill, or the story itself may have a frame in which the narrator appears as a character, with clues to the character's unreliability. A more dramatic use of the device delays the revelation until near the story's end. In some cases, the reader discovers that in the foregoing narrative, the narrator had concealed or greatly misrepresented vital pieces of information. Such a twist ending forces readers to reconsider their point of view and experience of the story. In some cases the narrator's unreliability is never fully revealed but only hinted at, leaving readers to wonder how much the narrator should be trusted and how the story should be interpreted.

Overview

Classification
Attempts have been made at a classification of unreliable narrators. William Riggan analysed in a 1981 study discernible types of unreliable narrators, focusing on the first-person narrator as this is the most common kind of unreliable narration. Adapted from his findings is the following list:

The Pícaro a narrator who is characterized by exaggeration and bragging, the first example probably being the soldier in Plautus' comedy Miles Gloriosus. Examples in more recent literature are Moll Flanders, Simplicius Simplicissimus or Felix Krull. 
The Madman a narrator who is either only experiencing mental defense mechanisms, such as (post-traumatic) dissociation and self-alienation, or severe mental illness, such as schizophrenia or paranoia. Examples include Das Cabinet des Dr. Caligari, Franz Kafka's self-alienating narrators, noir fiction and hardboiled fiction's "tough" (cynical) narrator who unreliably describes his own emotions, Barbara Covett in Notes on a Scandal, Charles Kinbote in Pale Fire, the unnamed protagonist of Edgar Allan Poe's The Tell-Tale Heart, and Patrick Bateman in American Psycho.
The Clown a narrator who does not take narrations seriously and consciously plays with conventions, truth, and the reader's expectations. Examples of the type include Tristram Shandy and Bras Cubas.
The Naïf a narrator whose perception is immature or limited through their point of view. Examples of naïves include Huckleberry Finn, Holden Caulfield and Forrest Gump.
The Liar a mature narrator of sound cognition who deliberately misrepresents themselves, often to obscure their unseemly or discreditable past conduct. John Dowell in Ford Madox Ford's The Good Soldier exemplifies this kind of narrator.

It remains a matter of debate whether and how a non-first-person narrator can be unreliable, though the deliberate restriction of information to the audience can provide instances of unreliable narrative, even if not necessarily of an unreliable narrator. For example, in the three interweaving plays of Alan Ayckbourn's The Norman Conquests, each confines the action to one of three locations during the course of a weekend.

Definitions and theoretical approaches
Wayne C. Booth was among the first critics to formulate a reader-centered approach to unreliable narration and to distinguish between a reliable and unreliable narrator on the grounds of whether the narrator's speech violates or conforms with general norms and values. He writes, "I have called a narrator reliable when he speaks for or acts in accordance with the norms of the work (which is to say the implied author's norms), unreliable when he does not." Peter J. Rabinowitz criticized Booth's definition for relying too much on facts external to the narrative, such as norms and ethics, which must necessarily be tainted by personal opinion. He consequently modified the approach to unreliable narration.

Rabinowitz' main focus is the status of fictional discourse in opposition to factuality. He debates the issues of truth in fiction, bringing forward four types of audience who serve as receptors of any given literary work:

 "Actual audience" (= the flesh-and-blood people who read the book)
 "Authorial audience" (= hypothetical audience to whom the author addresses his text)
 "Narrative audience" (= imitation audience which also possesses particular knowledge)
 "Ideal narrative audience" (= uncritical audience who accepts what the narrator is saying)

Rabinowitz suggests that "In the proper reading of a novel, then, events which are portrayed must be treated as both 'true' and 'untrue' at the same time. Although there are many ways to understand this duality, I propose to analyze the four audiences which it generates." Similarly, Tamar Yacobi has proposed a model of five criteria ('integrating mechanisms') which determine if a narrator is unreliable. Instead of relying on the device of the implied author and a text-centered analysis of unreliable narration, Ansgar Nünning gives evidence that narrative unreliability can be reconceptualized in the context of frame theory and of readers' cognitive strategies.

Unreliable Narration in this view becomes purely a reader's strategy of making sense of a text, i.e. of reconciling discrepancies in the narrator's account (cf. signals of unreliable narration). Nünning thus effectively eliminates the reliance on value judgments and moral codes which are always tainted by personal outlook and taste. Greta Olson recently debated both Nünning's and Booth's models, revealing discrepancies in their respective views.

and offers "an update of Booth's model by making his implicit differentiation between fallible and untrustworthy narrators explicit". Olson then argues "that these two types of narrators elicit different responses in readers and are best described using scales for fallibility and untrustworthiness." She proffers that all fictional texts that employ the device of unreliability can best be considered along a spectrum of fallibility that begins with trustworthiness and ends with unreliability. This model allows for all shades of grey in between the poles of trustworthiness and unreliability. It is consequently up to each individual reader to determine the credibility of a narrator in a fictional text.

Signals of unreliable narration
Whichever definition of unreliability one follows, there are a number of signs that constitute or at least hint at a narrator's unreliability. Nünning has suggested to divide these signals into three broad categories.

 Intratextual signs such as the narrator contradicting her or himself, having gaps in memory, or lying to other characters
 Extratextual signs such as contradicting the reader's general world knowledge or impossibilities (within the parameters of logic)
 Reader's literary competence. This includes the reader's knowledge about literary types (e.g. stock characters that reappear over centuries), knowledge about literary genres and its conventions or stylistic devices

See also
 Frame story
 Play within a play
 Rashomon effect, different narrators providing different accounts or stories of the same narrative events
 Tall tale

References

Further reading
 
 Shan, Den: "Unreliability", in Peter Hühn (ed.): The Living Handbook of Narratology, Hamburg: Hamburg University Press. (retrieved 8. March 2021)
 Smith, M. W. (1991). Understanding Unreliable Narrators. Urbana, IL: National Council of Teachers of English.

External links

Henry Sutton's top 10 unreliable narrators

 
Film theory
Style (fiction)
Point of view
Narrative techniques
1960s neologisms